4-HO-MPMI (also known as 4-Hydroxy-N-methyl-(α,N-trimethylene)-tryptamine or lucigenol) is a tryptamine derivative that is a psychedelic drug. It was developed by the team led by David Nichols from Purdue University in the late 1990s. This compound produces hallucinogen-appropriate responding in animal tests with a similar potency to the amphetamine-derived psychedelic DOI, and has two enantiomers, with only the (R)-enantiomer being active.

The binding affinity for 5-HT2A receptor is 13 ± 2 nM (Ki [125I]DOI). It is reported at doses starting at 0.5 mg and 1.0-1.5 mg seem to be psychedelic doses. The duration it is reported between six and eight hours. The effects, still not too documented, are OEV/CEV, sedation and anxiety.

See also
 4-HO-pyr-T
 4-HO-McPeT
 5F-MPMI
 5-MeO-MPMI
 5-MeO-pyr-T
 CP-135,807
 MPMI
 SN-22

References

Psychedelic tryptamines
Designer drugs